{{Infobox television
| image                = Ireland live logo.png
| caption              =
| alt_name             = Ireland Live at TenIreland Live News
| genre                = 
| director             = 
| presenter            = Alison Comyn
| theme_music_composer = 
| opentheme            = 
| endtheme             = 
| composer             = 
| country              = Republic of Ireland
| language             = English
| executive_producer   = Marcus Lehnen(Head of News)Margaret WardCece Leadon
| producer             = Yvonne RedmondSiobhán Silke
| editor               = Mick McCaffrey(News Editor)Deborah Naylor(Assistant Editor)
| location             = Dublin, Republic of Ireland
| camera               = Multi-camera
| runtime              = 60 minutes(10pm programme)30 minutes(5.30pm programme)
| company              = UTV Ireland
| channel              = UTV Ireland
| picture_format       = 576i (SDTV 16:9)
| audio_format         = 
| first_aired          = 
| last_aired           = 
| related              = UTV LiveRTÉ News and Current AffairsTV3 News 
}}Ireland Live was an Irish television news and current affairs service produced by UTV Ireland. Ireland Live featured national, international and regional news, including extended reports, interviews and sports coverage during its flagship hour-long programme at 10pm on weeknights. UTV Ireland's chief news anchor was Alison Comyn.

The news service was produced and broadcast from UTV Ireland's headquarters at Macken House in Dublin's Docklands, with district reporters and camera crews based at regional newsrooms in Cork, Limerick and Galway. UTV's Northern Ireland newsrooms in Belfast, Derry and the Parliament Buildings in Stormont are also utilised. International news coverage is provided by independent broadcast agency Feature Story News. UTV Ireland's head of news was Marcus Lehnen, with Margaret Ward and Cece Leadon as executive producers.

IFTA 2016 Winner. Best news programme. ‘Brexit Special’. Ireland Live News at 5.30.

Broadcast timesIreland Live broadcast a half-hour evening newscast and an hour-long programme at 10:00 p.m. Its early-evening news initially aired at 6:30 p.m. on weeknights until May 2015, when it moved to 5:30 p.m., putting it in direct comparison with TV3's The 5.30. In parallel with this change, UTV Ireland also began to broadcast hourly Ireland Live news updates throughout the day.Ireland Live also produced local news updates aired during UTV Ireland's simulcasts of Good Morning Britain''.

Ratings

On air team

Presenters
Alison Comyn (main anchor at 17:30 & 22:00 programmes)
Claire Brock (main anchor at 22:00) 
Jenny Buckley (Weather presenter)

Reporters and correspondents

Claire Brock
Eric Clarke
Paul Colgan (Economics Editor)
Darragh Collins
Marie Crowe (Sport)
Sean Dunne
Stephanie Grogan
Claudia Headon
Luke Holohan (Online Journalist)
Aidan Kelly
Zara King

Sharon Lynch (Dublin Videojournalist)
Sarah O'Connor
Sinead O'Donnell
Marése O'Sullivan (Online Journalist)
Bernard O'Toole (Sport)
Denis Mahon (Dublin Videojournalist)
Anita McSorley
Christina McSorley (Dublin Videojournalist)
Kevin Purcell (Reporter)
Mary Regan (Political Editor)
Naoimh Reilly (Cork Videojournalist)

Former presenters
Chris Donoghue (10pm programme)
Ger Gilroy (Friday sports preview)

After the station shut down many of the reporters moved to either RTÉ news or Virgin Media news.

References

External links
UTV Ireland: Top Stories

2015 Irish television series debuts
Irish television news shows
UTV (TV channel)